Edward Core, commonly called Ed Core, was an American politician from Ohio and a Republican member of the Ohio General Assembly representing district 87. Core died of a heart attack on August 9, 1999, and his son Tony was appointed to his seat.

Core died suddenly after being stricken behind the wheel of his car.  He was 65 years old.  He had specialized in transportation budget issues as a legislator.  Before being elected to the Ohio General Assembly in 1990, he had been a high school teacher and principal, and a Logan County commissioner.

References

County commissioners in Ohio
Republican Party members of the Ohio House of Representatives
1999 deaths
People from Logan County, Ohio
Year of birth missing